The 2021 Scottish Parliament election took place on 6 May 2021, under the provisions of the Scotland Act 1998. All 129 Members of the Scottish Parliament were elected in the sixth election since the parliament was re-established in 1999. The election was held alongside the Senedd election, English local elections, London Assembly and mayoral election and the Hartlepool by-election.

The election campaign started on 25 March 2021 during the COVID-19 pandemic in Scotland, although Parliament would not be officially dissolved until 5 May, the day before the election. The main parties that ran for election are the Scottish National Party (SNP), led by First Minister Nicola Sturgeon, the Scottish Conservatives led by Douglas Ross, Scottish Labour led by Anas Sarwar, the Scottish Liberal Democrats led by Willie Rennie, and the Scottish Greens, led by their co-leaders Patrick Harvie and Lorna Slater. Of those five parties, three changed their leader since the 2016 election.

Newer parties set up since the last election included Reform UK Scotland, led by Michelle Ballantyne; the Alba Party, led by former First Minister and SNP leader Alex Salmond; and All for Unity, led by George Galloway. These parties only competed for seats on the regional lists and all failed to win any seats.

The election concluded with the SNP winning a fourth consecutive term in government, winning 64 seats and an increase of one. The SNP gained Edinburgh Central, Ayr, and East Lothian as well as winning the largest share of the popular vote and the largest number of constituency seats in any Scottish Parliament election (62). The Greens won 8 seats, their best result to date at a Scottish Parliament election, while the Conservatives retained second place with 31 seats. Labour had its worst-ever result with 22 seats, and the lowest share of the vote in both Constituency & List votes for either Westminster or Holyrood since 1910. The Lib Dems won four seats, their worst showing at a Holyrood election to date.

The SNP and the Greens, both of which support Scottish independence, won 72 of the 129 seats in the parliament. Unionist parties achieved a slight majority of votes in constituency contests, whilst pro-independence parties did the same in the regional list votes. Voter turnout in the election reached 63.5%, the highest ever at a Scottish Parliament election. Following the election, the third Sturgeon government was formed, initially consisting of just the SNP but later including the appointment of Slater and Harvie as junior ministers, after the two parties negotiated a power-sharing agreement.

Background

Electoral events

2016 Scottish Parliament election 
At the 2016 election, the ruling Scottish National Party (SNP) lost its parliamentary majority but was able to continue governing under Nicola Sturgeon as a minority administration. At the same election, the Conservatives overtook Labour into second place, whilst the Greens overtook the Liberal Democrats into fourth place. No representatives of minor parties were elected to the Parliament.

2017 local elections 
The 2017 local elections saw the SNP hold its first-preference vote share compared to 2012 at 32%, finishing as the largest party in half of councils (sixteen).

The Conservatives considerably increased their vote share to 25%, an increase of 12%, as they became the largest party outright in six council areas and joint largest in one other. Labour fell 11% to 20% and became the largest party outright in only three councils, compared to fifteen in 2012.

Independent candidates won 10% of the vote, down 1%, as the Lib Dems were marginally up, winning 7% of votes. The Greens increased their share by 2%, to earn 4% of votes. For the first time since the electoral system was changed to the single transferable vote in 2007, no mainland council had a majority government.

2017 United Kingdom general election 
A month later, at the 2017 UK general election, the SNP lost twenty-one of its MPs, winning thirty-five seats on 37% of the vote (down thirteen percentage points). Most notably, former First Minister Alex Salmond and Angus Robertson, the party's Westminster leader, lost their seats.

The Conservatives won their highest vote share in any election in Scotland since 1979, at 29%, and their highest number of MPs since 1983, winning thirteen. They surpassed Labour on both counts, Labour earning 28% and seven seats – both an improvement over its 2015 showing. The Lib Dems won four seats, up three, but lost nearly 1% of their national vote share. None of the smaller parties managed more than 0.2% of the vote. UKIP and the Greens heavily reduced the number of candidates compared to 2015, with UKIP down from forty-one to ten and the Greens from thirty-one to three.

2019 European Parliament election 
The 2019 European election was dominated by the impending Brexit-deadline and was won in Scotland by the SNP. The party won three of the six seats, up one from 2014, in the European Parliament and increased its vote share from 29% to 38%; they were the largest party in all local authority areas, with the exception of Orkney and Shetland.

The Brexit Party, led by former-UKIP leader Nigel Farage, finished second on 15% – 4% higher than UKIP achieved in 2014. The pro-remain Liberal Democrats won 14% of the vote and were the largest party in the two Northern Isle councils.

Both the Conservatives and Labour performed badly across Britain, and finished fourth and fifth in Scotland respectively. The Tories fared relatively better in Scotland than elsewhere in the UK, achieving 12% (down 6% on 2014) in Scotland compared to 9% elsewhere. Labour lost 17% of the vote, finishing on 9%, and had its worst showing in Scotland since 1910; the Greens held level at 8%.

The Brexit Party, Lib Dems and Conservatives each won a single seat, in addition to the SNP's three. Labour (two) and UKIP (one) lost the seats they won in 2014.

2019 United Kingdom general election 
The SNP increased its vote share to 45% at the 2019 general election, only 5% behind its 2015 performance, reclaiming thirteen of the seats they lost in 2017, constituting a landslide victory.

The Conservatives lost half the seats they gained in 2017, but retained a quarter of the vote – down 4%. The party won a majority of seats in the House of Commons across the UK, its biggest majority since 1987. Labour recorded its worst general election result in Scotland since 1910, being again reduced to a single Scottish seat, and achieved a 19% share of the vote. Across Britain, the party suffered its worst result since 1935, with many former safe Labour seats being gained by the Conservatives.

The Liberal Democrats made no net losses, but Jo Swinson, the party's UK leader, lost her seat to the SNP. The party increased its share by 3%, to record just under one in ten votes. The Greens managed 1% of the vote, as they stood in twenty-two seats.

Leadership changes 
Three parties underwent leadership changes during the parliamentary term. In August 2017, Kezia Dugdale resigned as Leader of Scottish Labour and was replaced by Richard Leonard. On 14 January 2021, less than four months before the election was held, Leonard resigned. The 2021 Scottish Labour leadership election was held in February 2021, and was won by Anas Sarwar.

On 1 August 2019, Lorna Slater became co-leader of the Scottish Greens alongside Patrick Harvie.

Later in August 2019, Ruth Davidson resigned as leader of the Scottish Conservatives and was succeeded by Jackson Carlaw. Carlaw, however, himself resigned from the leadership in July 2020, and Douglas Ross won the subsequent leadership election without opposition.

Expansion of the electorate
This is the first election after the passage of the Scottish Elections (Franchise and Representation) Act, which extended the franchise to those serving prison sentences of 12 months or less. In 2005, the United Kingdom was found in breach of Protocol 1, Article 3 of the European Convention on Human Rights in regards of prisoner voting rights in the European Court of Human Rights as a result of Hirst v United Kingdom (No 2); the Act brings Scotland in line with the court ruling.

This act also allows all foreign nationals resident in Scotland to vote and all those with indefinite leave to remain or equivalent status, including pre–settled status in the United Kingdom, to stand as candidates. A BBC News report in April 2021 said that there were around 55,000 foreign nationals who had been given the right to vote as a result of these changes, including 20,000 refugees.

Registering to vote
In order to vote by post, a person must have registered for a postal vote by 6 April 2021. Everyone seeking to vote in person on the day of the election must have registered to vote before the deadline at 11:59pm on 19 April 2021.

Date
Under the Scotland Act 1998, an ordinary general election to the Scottish Parliament would normally have been held on the first Thursday in May four years after the 2016 election, i.e. in May 2020. This would have clashed with the proposed date of a UK general election, although this became a moot point when a snap UK general election was held in June 2017 (a further UK general election was held in December 2019). In November 2015, the Scottish Government published a Scottish Elections (Dates) Bill, which proposed to extend the term of the Parliament to five years. That Bill was passed by the Scottish Parliament on 25 February 2016 and received Royal Assent on 30 March 2016, setting the new date for the election as 6 May 2021.

The Scottish Elections (Dates) Act did not affect the legal possibilities for the Parliament to be dissolved earlier, those being;

 That the date of the poll may be varied by up to one month either way by the monarch, on the proposal of the Presiding Officer.
 If Parliament itself resolves that it should be dissolved, with at least two-thirds of the Members (i.e. 86 Members) voting in favour, the Presiding Officer proposes a date for an extraordinary general election and the Parliament is dissolved by the monarch by royal proclamation.
 If Parliament fails to nominate one of its members to be First Minister within 28 days, irrespective of whether at the beginning or in the middle of a parliamentary term. Therefore, if the First Minister resigned, Parliament would then have 28 days to elect a successor and if no new First Minister was elected then the Presiding Officer would ask for Parliament to be dissolved. This process could also be triggered if the First Minister lost a vote of confidence by a simple majority, as they must then resign.

Nevertheless, no extraordinary general elections have been held to date. Any extraordinary general election would be in addition to the ordinary general elections, unless held less than six months before the due date of an ordinary general election, in which case it would supplant it. This would not affect the year in which the subsequent ordinary general election would be held.

On 16 November 2020, the Scottish General Election (Coronavirus) Bill was introduced. This draft legislation stated that while the next election was intended to be held on 6 May 2021, the Presiding Officer would gain the power to postpone the election by up to six months if the spread of COVID-19 made that date impractical. The bill also proposed to change the date of dissolution to the day before the election, meaning that the Parliament could be recalled during the election period. The bill was enacted and received Royal Assent on 29 January 2021. Parliament was in fact recalled on 12 April, to allow MSPs to mark the death of Prince Philip, Duke of Edinburgh.

Retiring MSPs

James Dornan announced in February 2020 his intention to retire at the next Holyrood election, but reversed this decision some months later.

Parties

The SNP, Conservatives, Labour and Liberal Democrats fielded candidates in all 73 constituencies and all eight of the regional ballots. Five other parties contested both all eight regions and at least one constituency: the Scottish Greens (12 constituencies) the Scottish Libertarian Party (9), the Scottish Family Party (7), UKIP (5) and the Freedom Alliance (4). Four parties – Abolish the Scottish Parliament Party, Alba Party, All for Unity, and Reform UK – stood in all eight electoral regions, but did not contest any constituencies.

Six other parties contested some of the regions and at least one constituency: TUSC (3 regions and 3 constituencies), Restore Scotland (2 regions, 4 constituencies), Scotia Future (2 of each), the Communist Party of Britain (2 regions and 1 constituency), the Reclaim Party (1 of each) and the Vanguard Party (also 1 of each). Five other parties – Independent Green Voice (5 regions), Renew (5), the Social Democratic Party (2), Women's Equality (2) and Animal Welfare (1) – contested some of the regions, but not any constituencies.

The Scottish Socialist Party, which participated in the last election as part of the electoral alliance RISE – Scotland's Left Alliance, opted not to participate in this election, for the first time since its inception.

List of parties contesting all regional ballots

Election system, seats and regions

The total number of Members of the Scottish Parliament (MSPs) elected to the Parliament is 129.

The Scottish Parliament uses an additional member system (AMS), designed to produce approximate proportional representation for each region. There are 8 regions, each sub-divided into smaller constituencies. There is a total of 73 constituencies. Each constituency elects one MSP by the plurality (first past the post) system of election. Each region elects 7 additional MSPs using an additional member system. A modified D'Hondt method, using the constituency results, is used to elect these additional MSPs.

The boundaries of the 73 constituencies last changed as of the 2011 Scottish Parliament election, as did the configuration of the electoral regions used to elect "list" members of the Scottish Parliament. These revisions were the outcome of the First Periodical Review of the Scottish Parliament's constituencies and regions conducted by the Boundary Commission for Scotland; the Review was announced on 3 July 2007 and the Commission published its final report on 26 May 2010.

The Scottish Parliament constituencies have not been coterminous with Scottish Westminster constituencies since the 2005 general election, when the 72 former UK Parliament constituencies were replaced with a new set of 59, generally larger, constituencies (see Scottish Parliament (Constituencies) Act 2004). The size difference between Westminster and Holyrood boundaries was due to diverge further upon the implementation of the Sixth Periodic Review of Westminster constituencies, which has not been voted upon by Parliament. The 2023 Periodic Review of Westminster constituencies for a UK total of 650 MPs commenced in England in 2021 and will complete for the UK by 2023.

Campaign 
The election campaign started on 25 March 2021. The Scottish Conservatives launched their campaign the same day, with a focus on promoting Scotland's recovery from the COVID-19 pandemic.

On 26 March 2021, the Alba Party was publicly launched by former First Minister of Scotland and SNP leader, Alex Salmond. The party announced plans to stand list-only candidates. The party later gained two sitting MPs who defected from the SNP. The Action for Independence party, which had intended to pursue a similar list-only strategy, announced they would stand down their candidates in favour of Alba. Sturgeon said she would refuse to have any dealings with Salmond unless he apologises to the women who had accused him of harassment.

BBC Scotland announced that it would broadcast two debates between the main parties' leaders; the first was aired on 30 March 2021 and was moderated by the corporation's Scotland editor Sarah Smith. The debate included key questions from the audience on the COVID-19 recovery, climate change, and a second referendum on Scottish independence. The second BBC debate was held on 4 May 2021 and was moderated by BBC Scotland's political editor Glenn Campbell.

Commercial broadcaster STV held their leaders' debate on 13 April, moderated by their political editor Colin Mackay. NUS Scotland held a debate on specifically on student issues which was moderated by NUS Scotland president, Matt Crilly on 20 April which featured the three main party leaders.

On 1 April, Planet Radio announced that their Clyde 2 station would be hosting a Leaders Phone-In with the main parties' leaders every Sunday before the election. Douglas Ross was the first to be interviewed on 4 April, with Willie Rennie following on 18 April. Whilst Nicola Sturgeon was set to be interviewed on 11 April, campaigning was delayed following the death of Prince Philip and her phone-in was instead held on 22 April. Patrick Harvie followed on 25 April; and Anas Sarwar had the final phone-in on 2 May.

Following Prince Philip's death on 9 April, the SNP, Conservatives, Labour, Greens and Liberal Democrats said they would suspend election campaigning until further notice. After discussion between the parties, they agreed to resume campaigning after a special parliamentary session on 12 April to make tributes and to pause activities again on the day of the funeral (17 April).

Election debates

Opinion polling 

Graph of opinion poll results prior to the 2021 Scottish Parliament election. Trendlines are 30-day moving averages.

Key
 SNP – Scottish National Party
 Conservative – Scottish Conservatives
 Labour – Scottish Labour
 Lib Dem – Scottish Liberal Democrats
 Green – Scottish Greens
 UKIP – UK Independence Party
 Reform – Reform UK
 SSP – Scottish Socialist Party
 Alba – Alba Party
 AFU – All for Unity

Target seats
Below are listed all the constituencies which required a swing of less than 5% from the 2016 result to change hands. The most marginal opportunity for the Greens was in Glasgow Kelvin, which they needed a 7.1% swing to gain. The Liberal Democrats' best bet was Caithness, Sutherland and Ross, which required a 6.1% swing. The SNP ended up holding both of these constituencies.

SNP targets

Conservative targets

Labour targets

Results

Overall

Votes summary

Central Scotland 

|-
! colspan="2" style="width: 150px"|Party
! Elected candidates
! style="width: 40px"|Seats
! style="width: 40px"|+/−
! style="width: 50px"|Votes
! style="width: 40px"|%
! style="width: 40px"|+/−%
|-

Glasgow 

|-
! colspan="2" style="width: 150px"|Party
! Elected candidates
! style="width: 40px"|Seats
! style="width: 40px"|+/−
! style="width: 50px"|Votes
! style="width: 40px"|%
! style="width: 40px"|+/−%
|-

Highlands and Islands

|-
! colspan="2" style="width: 150px"|Party
! Elected candidates
! style="width: 40px"|Seats
! style="width: 40px"|+/−
! style="width: 50px"|Votes
! style="width: 40px"|%
! style="width: 40px"|+/−%
|-

Lothian 

|-
! colspan="2" style="width: 150px"|Party
! Elected candidates
! style="width: 40px"|Seats
! style="width: 40px"|+/−
! style="width: 50px"|Votes
! style="width: 40px"|%
! style="width: 40px"|+/−%
|-

Mid Scotland and Fife 

|-
! colspan="2" style="width: 150px"|Party
! Elected candidates
! style="width: 40px"|Seats
! style="width: 40px"|+/−
! style="width: 50px"|Votes
! style="width: 40px"|%
! style="width: 40px"|+/−%
|-

North East Scotland 

|-
! colspan="2" style="width: 150px"|Party
! Elected candidates
! style="width: 40px"|Seats
! style="width: 40px"|+/−
! style="width: 50px"|Votes
! style="width: 40px"|%
! style="width: 40px"|+/−%
|-

South Scotland 

|-
! colspan="2" style="width: 150px"|Party
! Elected candidates
! style="width: 40px"|Seats
! style="width: 40px"|+/−
! style="width: 50px"|Votes
! style="width: 40px"|%
! style="width: 40px"|+/−%
|-

West Scotland 

|-
! colspan="2" style="width: 150px"|Party
! Elected candidates
! style="width: 40px"|Seats
! style="width: 40px"|+/−
! style="width: 50px"|Votes
! style="width: 40px"|%
! style="width: 40px"|+/−%
|-

Constituency seat changes compared to 2016

MSPs who lost their seats

Analysis
The SNP won 64 seats, falling one seat short of an overall majority. Some commentators put this down to unionists voting tactically for Conservative, Labour and Lib Dem candidates. According to psephologist John Curtice, "Denying the SNP an overall majority was, indeed, a collective effort – at least on the part of Unionist voters, who on the constituency ballot demonstrated a remarkable willingness to back whichever pro-Union party appeared to be best placed locally to defeat the SNP. [...] These patterns had a decisive impact on the outcome." This was apparent in seats like Dumbarton, where incumbent Labour MSP Jackie Baillie saw her 0.3% majority increased to 3.9%, whilst both the Conservative and Lib Dem vote share decreased.

In The National, Emer O'Toole questioned whether social media adverts with "a lack of transparency over funding" may have cost the SNP key seats as well. The day before the election, The Guardian reported that anti-independence groups and campaigners had "spent tens of thousands of pounds in the past week", including on Facebook adverts, calling for tactical voting to prevent the SNP getting a majority. One of these groups was Scotland Matters, whose founder, Professor Hugh Pennington said, "Across the country as a whole, tactical voting is obviously one of the ways forward to basically harm the SNP, not to put too fine a point on it."

Additionally, the Greens claimed that they may have been deprived of two seats because of Independent Green Voice (IGV), a far-right party which has nothing to do with the Scottish Greens (who support Scottish independence). IGV received nearly 10,000 votes, including 2,210 in Glasgow (where the Greens were 1,000 short of gaining a seat) and 1,690 in South Scotland (where the Greens fell 100 short). This potentially prevented pro-independence parties from having a 19-seat majority instead of 15 seats.

The Scottish and Welsh Election Studies 2021, revealed on 13 June, found that around a third of Scottish voters who decided to vote differently in the run-up to the election did so to stop another party, and that 90% of those who did this did so in a bid to prevent the SNP winning the seat. Rob Johns, Professor in Politics at the University of Essex, said: "[W]e found a lot more switching than we had expected. The polls had suggested that not much was changing and obviously the overall election result was almost eerily similar to 2016. That can mean that nobody has changed their mind or it can mean lots of people have changed their mind – but these have cancelled out as people have moved in opposing directions. We found there was quite a lot more of that than we had expected."

Voter demographics
Data from Savanta ComRes:

Campaign spending

Aftermath

Nicola Sturgeon was nominated as First Minister by a vote of the parliament on 18 May 2021. Her cabinet was approved by the parliament two days later and thus the Third Sturgeon government, a minority government, was formed.

On 3 August 2021, it was reported that a co-operation agreement between the SNP and the Greens was "on the brink of being finalised" and could see Green MSPs take ministerial positions in government. On 19 August, the power-sharing agreement between the two parties was announced. Under the terms of the agreement, the Greens have two MSPs appointed as junior ministers in the government who are invited to attend cabinet meetings when their portfolios are being discussed. The Greens signed up to the bulk of the SNP's policies, but in areas of disagreement such as international relations and fee-paying schools the two parties are free to publicly disagree. The agreement states that the Greens support the government on votes of confidence and supply.

A deal that would see Patrick Harvie and Lorna Slater made ministers was revealed on 26 August, subject to being voted upon by Green Party members. Two days later, members of both parties overwhelmingly voted in favour of the deal.

See also 
Other elections in the UK which were held on the same day:
 2021 London Assembly election
 2021 London mayoral election
 2021 Senedd election
 2021 United Kingdom local elections

Footnotes

References

External links
 Election 2021  (on the Scottish Parliament website)

General elections to the Scottish Parliament
Scottish Parliament election
2021 in Scotland
2020s elections in Scotland